Uyire Unakkaga is a 1986 Indian Tamil language film, directed by K. Rangaraj. The film stars Mohan, Nadhiya, Chinni Jayanth and Vijayakumar. It was released on 7 March 1986.

Plot 
Running away from her fantastically wealthy but selfish father, king Vijayaragunath Boobapathy and Asha Devi, his new partner especially, Vijayanirmala Devi, princess and unique heiress, hides her real identity, by claiming to be Uma, a distant cousin, with Balumurali, at a meeting, when she is welcomed within her humble but happy family led by the mother of the latter, soft and sweet Abhirami, also consisting of her older brother Murugesan a bus conductor, of both sisters of the young man (Balu), Kanchana, the girl, Sulochana, the biggest and Ramu. While all this small world is waltzing in a dream, one night, Abhirami believes to have poisoned her children when she notices that a lizard is drowned in the bowl of milk which she has just given them. Discouraged, she drinks the rest. It turns out that the small reptile fell later. Saved at the last minute, the family surrounds the convalescent with their love... Meanwhile, the monarch ordered to a group of motorcyclists to find his daughter, at any discretion. But in front of their failure, he calls the police... Meanwhile, Balu and Uma fall in love. Abhirami, informed, is delighted about it as well as the rest of the family. While the preparations for the marriage are underway, the men of the sovereign get closer inexorably to the princess... The unexpected arrival of Kadheresan, the father of the "real" Uma, lays bare the truth of Vijayanirmala, casting a chill on Balu, feeling deceived since the beginning. So all the family distances itself from the princess. Suffering from this situation, Vijayanirmala lets herself die until Balu intervenes and he makes her understand that he will always love her. Their reunions are shortened because Abhirami, sick person at heart since the death of her husband, is at the moment in a critical state and could die if she is not immediately operated on. It is necessary to gather a very large sum of money. Balu and his uncle Murugesan are actively used to it. This is when in the newspaper, an important reward is offered to whom would give information of the disappeared princess. Sulochana emits the idea to denounce Vijayanirmala, who is immediately reprimanded by Balu and so by Abhirami, who prefers to die than to send back his son's lover. In the greatest secrecy, Vijayanirmala makes a decision: to surrender to her father in exchange for the operation of Abhirami, to take all the hospitable expenses under his responsibility. On the way, she finds Balu, saying farewell to him without him suspecting anything. Vijayaragunath keeps his promise. The operation is successful. Vijayanirmala leaves also the family, not without shedding tears. She leaves in a helicopter with her father Balu, who arrives at the hospital, is informed. While he tries to catch up with them, on a motorcycle, he is violently taken by the men of king who thrash him and leave him for dead. Balu, in a last effort, gets up and begins to run behind the aircraft, desperately. The monarch, in the view of this distressing show, cannot refrain from ordering to the pilot to land, in the happy bewilderment of his daughter, Vijayanirmala. From the opening, she runs on meeting Balu and they embrace.

Cast 

Mohan as Balu alias Balumurali
Nadhiya as Uma alias princess Vijayanirmala Devi
Sujatha as Abhirami, Balu's mother
Chinni Jayanth  as Balu's friend
Sangeeta as Asha Devi
Vijayakumar as King Vijayaragunath Boobapathy of Jayanagar Raja
Charle as Murugesan Mudeliyar's assistant
Meesai Murugesan as Murugesan Mudeliyar, Abhirami's elder brother
Senthil as The shoemaker
Kovai Sarala as The shoemaker's girlfriend
Tinku as Ramu alias Ramuvilass
A.R.S.
V. Gopalakrishnan as Kadheresan
Thyagu as Balu's friend
Baby Meena as princess Vijayanirmala Devi at 10 years

Soundtrack 
The music was composed by Laxmikant–Pyarelal.

Reception 
Kalki appreciated the performances of Mohan and Sujatha, adding that Nadhiya got a great chance to exhibit her acting prowess through this film, but that the film itself was unnecessarily stretched.

References

External links 
 

1980s romance films
1980s Tamil-language films
1986 films
Films directed by K. Rangaraj
Films scored by Laxmikant–Pyarelal
Indian romance films